The Law School of the Aristotle University of Thessaloniki is considered one of the most prestigious Greek law schools. It is ranked first among the Greek law schools and is considered one of the 200 best law schools in the world.

History
The law department was founded and began its operation in 1930  during the premiership of Alexandros Papanastassiou. One of the first 5 faculties of the Aristotle University of Thessaloniki was the Faculty of Law and Economics consisting of two departments, Law Department and Economics and Political Science Department. A special committee took place (composed of Professors A. Andreades, K. Varvaressos, S. Seferiades and C. Sfiris) in order to elect the first professors of the Law school; Periklis Vizoukides (who was the first Dean of the faculty and afterwards rector of the Aristotle University of Thessaloniki), Professor of Civil Law, Xenophon Zolotas Politic Economy professor, Jean Spiropoulos Professor of International Law, Dimosthenis Stefanides Politic Economy professor and Thrasivoulos Haralambides Professor of Commercial law. Lately in '00s, Faculty of Law and Economics was expanded with Political Science department and hence was renamed into Faculty of Law, Economics and Political Science. In 1962 the graduate program (the first LLM in Greece) of the law school began its operation. Law school takes part in many international law competitions such as Ph. Jessup Moot Court International competition. In this competition, Law School of Thessaloniki in 2005 came 1st among 600 universities from all over the world (in the writing part of the competition), 5th in 2001, 4th in 2004 (in the writing part of the competition), 6th in 2007 and 5th in 2008, 3rd in 2009. In addition, in 2011 law school came first in Europe as it participated in a competition which was organized by the World Trade Organization, accomplishing to beat popular law schools such as Oxford's, King's College and LSE's law schools.

Pr. Ioannis Deligiannis Library 

Dean Pr. Dimitrios Papasteriou took initiative to organize Law school's library and hence the library was established in 1998. It is located on the third floor of the Faculty of Law, Economics and Political Science. It is called Pr. Ioannis Deligiannis library in the honour of the popular civil law professor (and rector of the Aristotle University of Thessaloniki) Ioannis Deligiannis. Until recently, most books were kept in law school's departments. Pr. Deligiannis library has acquired donations by famous professors and politicians such as Alexandros Papanastasiou, Aristovoulos Manesis, Alexandros Svolos, Themistoklis Tsatsos, H. Muller etc. In addition the US government has made a donation to the library. Pr. Deligiannis library is the largest law library in Greece.

Notable alumni and professors 

The law school has produced leaders in law, government, and society, including:
 Gianna Angelopoulos-Daskalaki, Greek politician and businesswoman, named as one of the 50 most powerful women by Forbes magazine. She was the president of the Organizing Committee for the 2004 Summer Olympics in Athens, Greece. She studied law at the Aristotle University of Thessaloniki.
 Evangelos Venizelos, President of the Panhellenic Socialist Movement, former Deputy Prime Minister and Minister for Finance. He is Professor of Constitutional Law at the Law School of the Aristotle University of Thessaloniki.
 Vassilis Vassilikos, Writer and diplomat.
 Vassilios Nikopoulos, President of the Supreme Court.
 Christos Sartzetakis, Greek jurist and elder statesman. He entered the Law Faculty of the Aristotle University of Thessaloniki in 1946, and received his degree in 1950, after which he practiced law in Thessaloniki. He was the unyielding prosecutor in the sensational case of the assassination of the left-wing member of parliament Grigoris Lambrakis, committed on 22 May 1963 in Thessaloniki by far-right extremists. On 9 March 1985 he was elected by the Greek Parliament as President of the Hellenic Republic for one 5-year term, succeeding Konstantinos Karamanlis.
 Vassilios Skouris, the 10th President of the European Court of Justice. Professor of Public Law
 Krateros Ioannou received a law degree and a doctorate in international law from the University of Thessaloniki in 1971. Professor of public international law and Community law at the law faculty of the University of Thrace, he acted as legal advisor at national and international level; in particular, he was a Member of the Greek Delegation to the General Assembly of the UN from 1983 and Chairman of the Committee of Experts for the Improvement of the Procedure under the Convention of Human Rights of the Council of Europe from 1989 to 1992. Furthermore, he was judge of the European Court of Justice
 Pelayia Yessiou-Faltsi, Professor of Civil Procedure law and honorary attorney at the Supreme Court
 Andreas Loverdos, former Minister for Health and Social Solidarity and professor of Constitutional Law
 Dimitris Sioufas, ex-Speaker of the Hellenic Parliament
 Philippos Petsalnikos, ex-Speaker of the Hellenic Parliament
 Symeon C. Symeonides, Dean of the Willamette University College of Law and President of the American Society of Comparative Law
 Haris Kastanidis, former Minister for the Minister for the Interior and Public Order
 Jean Spiropoulos, Judge at the International Court of Justice, professor of Public International Law
 Philomila Tsoukala, Associate Professor of law at Georgetown Law school
 Petros C. Mavroidis, Edwin B. Parker Professor of Foreign and Comparative Law at Columbia Law School
 Xenophon Zolotas, former Prime Minister of Greece
 Nikolaos Papantoniou, popular professor of Civil Law and Minister of Justice (1984)
 Paraskevi Naskou-Perraki, ad hoc judge at the European Court of Human Rights and Professor at the University of Macedonia
 Dimitris Evrigenis, judge at the European Court of Human Rights and popular Professor of International Law at Thessaloniki Law School
 Michalis Chrysohoidis, former Minister for Regional Development and Competitiveness and Minister for Citizen Protection
 George Petalotis, former Deputy Minister to the Prime Minister of Greece and Government Spokesman
 Elias Petropoulos, author
 Haris Tagaras, lawyer linguist at  the Council of the European Communities (1980 to 1982); Administrator at the Court of Justice of the European Communities and at the Commission of the European Communities (1986 to 1990); external  consultant for European matters at the Ministry of Justice and member of the Permanent Committee of the Lugano Convention (1991 to 2004); member of the national Postal and Telecommunications Commission (2000 to 2002; from 2005 judge at the Civil Service Tribunal Of The European Union
 Miltiadis Papaioannou, former Minister of Justice, Transparency and Human Rights
 Dimitris Tsatsos, legal scholar and former Member of the European Parliament. He was professor of Constitutional Law
 Michalis Papakonstantinou, former Minister of Justice
 A. N. Yiannopoulos, is a former professor at Tulane University Law School, expert on civil law and comparative law, founder of the Civil Law Commentaries
 Xavier Bettel, Prime Minister of Luxembourg

See also 
 List of universities in Greece
 List of modern universities in Europe (1801–1945)

Sources 
«Σχολή Νομικών, Οικονομικών και Πολιτικών Επιστημών: 75 χρόνια», Αριστοτέλειο Πανεπιστήμιο Θεσσαλονίκης, εκδ. Α.Π.Θ. (Faculty of Law, Economics and Political Science: 75 years, Aristotle University of Thessaloniki, A.U.Th. publications)

Law schools in Greece

1930 establishments in Greece